Hampton House is a historic home located near Arcadia, Davidson County, North Carolina. It was built about 1879, and is a two-story, three bay, frame I-house of simple Greek Revival style.  The -story rear wing is of log construction and dates to the early-19th century.  It was attached to the main block at the time of its construction in 1879.  Also on the property is a contributing pegged frame granary.

It was added to the National Register of Historic Places in 1984.

References

Houses on the National Register of Historic Places in North Carolina
Greek Revival houses in North Carolina
Houses completed in 1879
Houses in Davidson County, North Carolina
National Register of Historic Places in Davidson County, North Carolina